Helen Blanche May Burnham (born 10 May 1956) is a British former swimmer. Burnham competed in the women's 100 metre breaststroke at the 1976 Summer Olympics. At the ASA National British Championships she won the 100 metres breaststroke title and the 200 metres breaststroke title in 1975.

References

External links
 

1956 births
Living people
British female swimmers
Olympic swimmers of Great Britain
Swimmers at the 1976 Summer Olympics
People from Bromley
Sportspeople from London
20th-century British women